Rena Idrettslag is a Norwegian sports club from Rena, founded in 1906. It has sections for association football, gymnastics, athletics, orienteering, swimming, triathlon, tennis, cheerleading, cycling, biathlon, and Nordic skiing.

The club has a ski jumping hill named Renabakken. The hill records are held by Lars Bystøl (large hill), Anders Bardal (normal hill, men) and Anette Sagen (normal hill, women). In skiing, the club is also known for arranging Birkebeinerrennet together with Lillehammer SK.

The men's football team plays in the 4. Divisjon. The team played one season in the 3. Divisjon, in 1994.

The club has had one national medalist in athletics. Mette E. Storholm took bronze medals in the standing long jump in 1979 and 1981.

References

 Official site 

Football clubs in Norway
Athletics clubs in Norway
Orienteering clubs in Norway
Sport in Hedmark
Åmot
Sports clubs established in 1892
1892 establishments in Norway